Rescue from Gilligan's Island is a 1978 made-for-television comedy film that continues the adventures of the shipwrecked castaways from the 1964–67 sitcom Gilligan's Island, starring Bob Denver and Alan Hale, Jr., and featuring all the original cast except Tina Louise. The film first aired on NBC as a two-part special on October 14 and October 21, 1978. The film has the characters finally being rescued after 15 years on the island. The film was directed by Leslie H. Martinson.

Plot
Fifteen years after the original shipwreck, the seven castaways are still stranded on the island. Meanwhile, in a Soviet Union-type country, military scientists destroy an orbiting satellite that has a disc containing top-secret information to prevent the satellite from crashing to Earth. The metal disc survives and lands on the island.

The Professor realizes the disc has a unique alloy that can be used to make a new barometer. Using the barometer, the Professor deduces a tsunami could destroy the island. To survive the deadly wave and potentially effect a rescue, the castaways build a raft by tying their huts together.

The next morning, the castaways awaken and realize they were swept off the island on the makeshift raft. When Gilligan accidentally sets the raft on fire, the United States Coast Guard spots the smoke and rescues them. Once back in modern society, the castaways are initially confused by how different everything is. After much media hype, the group reunites at Christmas aboard the S.S. Minnow II.

Foreign spies have discovered that Gilligan has their lost disc and set out to recover it. Meanwhile, Skipper and Gilligan learn that the insurance company refuses to issue a settlement payment for the first Minnow unless all their former passengers sign a statement testifying that the Skipper was not responsible for the shipwreck. They first visit Ginger, who has been cast in a movie, though she is dismayed by how much film industry standards have changed. She agrees to sign the statement. Gilligan and the Skipper then reconnect with the Professor who has found that his castaway celebrity is overshadowing his research work at the university. The Professor also signs the insurance statement while the foreign spies continually attempt to secure the disk from Gilligan. The Skipper and Gilligan next go to see the Howells. They sign the insurance statement after ejecting snobbish friends from their house when they overhear them making disparaging remarks about Gilligan and Skipper. The spies, hidden among the guests, are also ejected.

The two then go to see Mary Ann, who is about to marry her old fiancé, Herbert. She no longer loves him but feels obligated to go through with the wedding. To spare Mary Ann from an unhappy union, Skipper and Gilligan deliberately disrupt the ceremony where the foreign spies are among the guests. Mary Ann is relieved to learn that Herbert actually loves someone else and she signs the insurance statement.

The insurance company finally pays for the first Minnow and the former castaways gather for a reunion cruise aboard the Minnow II. The spies make one last attempt to obtain the disc, but are thwarted by the FBI. During the cruise, the Minnow II is caught in a storm. Gilligan unknowingly rendered the compass useless by removing its magnet when cleaning it, causing the Skipper to sail in the wrong direction. The group lands on a beach and realize they are on their old island after finding a piece of wood from the original Minnow.

Cast

 Bob Denver as Gilligan
 Alan Hale, Jr. as Jonas "The Skipper" Grumby
 Jim Backus as Thurston Howell III
 Natalie Schafer as Mrs. "Lovey" Howell III
 Judith Baldwin as Ginger Grant
 Russell Johnson as Professor Roy Hinkley
 Dawn Wells as Mary Ann Summers
 Vincent Schiavelli as Dimitri
 Art LaFleur as Ivan
 Norman Bartold as Producer
 Barbara Mallory as Cindy Smith
 June Whitley Taylor as Miss Ainsworth
 Martin Rudy as Dean
 Mary Gregory as Mrs. Devonshire
 Glenn Robards as Mr. Devonshire
 Diane Chesney as Mrs. Fellows
 Victor Rogers as Mr. Fellows
 Michael Flanagan as Director
 Martin Ashe as Butler
 John Wheeler as Studio Guard
 Alex Rodine as 1st Officer
 Don Marshall as FBI Man #1
 Mel Prestige as Governor's Aide
 Lewis Arquette as Judge
 Judd Lawrence as Technician
 Michael Macready as FBI Man #2
 Richard Rorke as Helicopter Pilot
 Marcus K. Mukai as Hawaiian Man
 Snag Werris as Camera Man
 Micki Waugh as Pom Pom Girl
 Alisa Powell as Pom Pom Girl
 Portia Stevens as Pom Pom Girl
 Candace Bowen as Pom Pom Girl
 Mario Machado as Reporter (uncredited)

Production
Tina Louise declined to appear in the movie, claiming that she was not going to reprise the role that she felt had devastated her career. Reportedly she asked for a prohibitively large sum of money. Judith Baldwin, a substantially younger actress who resembled Louise, was cast in her place. The following year, Baldwin would go on to play Ginger again in The Castaways on Gilligan's Island. Cassandra Peterson also auditioned for the part of Ginger, shortly before KHJ-TV offered her the horror-host position as 'Elvira, Mistress of the Dark'.

Release
Rescue from Gilligan's Island aired in two parts on NBC on October 14 and 21, 1978. The first part garnered a 30.2 rating and a 52 share. This was just below the ratings of the top two TV series that season, Laverne & Shirley and Three's Company. The made-for-TV-movie was released on DVD on January 1, 2002, August 1, 2012, June 23, 2015, and July 9, 2015.

References

External links

1978 television films
1978 films
American adventure comedy films
1970s adventure comedy films
Films directed by Leslie H. Martinson
Films scored by Gerald Fried
Gilligan's Island films
Television series reunion films
Films based on television series
Television films based on television series
NBC network original films
1970s English-language films
1970s American films